Katzenjammer is a German word literally meaning "cat's wail" (caterwaul) and hence "discordant sound", sometimes used to indicate a general state of depression or bewilderment. In the English speaking world it is often used as a term for a hangover, with the sufferer's groans of discomfort being likened to a wailing cat. In fact, the German language uses the term "Kater" (tomcat) for this situation.

Katzenjammer may refer to:

 Katzenjammer (band), a Norwegian pop/folk band
 Katzenjammer Kabarett, a French rock band
 The Katzenjammer Kids, an American comic strip
 Fran Katzenjammer, a fictional character in the British sitcom Black Books
 "Katzenjammer", a song by Big Talk
 "Katzenjammer", a song by Kyuss on the album Wretch
 Katzenjammer Cave, in the Makapansgat paleontological site
 Worbey & Farrell, previously known as Katzenjammer, a British piano musical comedy duo
 The Katzenjammer Kids a short-lived band founded by Randy Rhoads
 Fred Katz and his Jammers, a 1959 jazz cello album
 “The Katzenjammers” a Trinidad Steelband led by Percy Thomas, winners of the Trinidad Steelband Festival competition (year unknown), recorded by Cook Laboratories and published circa 1957.
 "Katzenjammer," a 2009 album by Car Seat Headrest's Will Toledo as Nervous Young Men